Rudolf Baier (22 March 1892 – 21 October 1945) was a German road racing cyclist who competed in the 1912 Summer Olympics.

In 1912, he was a member of the German cycling team which finished sixth in the team time trial event. In the individual time trial competition he finished 27th.

References

1892 births
1945 deaths
German male cyclists
Olympic cyclists of Germany
Cyclists at the 1912 Summer Olympics
Cyclists from Dresden
People from the Kingdom of Saxony